Snow Valley may refer to:

Snow Valley Ski Club, a ski resort in Edmonton, Alberta, Canada
Ski Snow Valley, a ski resort in Barrie, Ontario, Canada
Snow Valley Mountain Resort, a ski resort in Running Springs, California, United States